Joe Diffie was an American country music artist. His discography comprises 12 studio albums, six compilation albums and 38 singles. Among his albums, 1993's Honky Tonk Attitude and 1994's Third Rock from the Sun are his best-selling, having been certified platinum by the Recording Industry Association of America (RIAA) for shipments of one million copies. His singles include five Number Ones on the Hot Country Songs charts: "Home" (his debut single), as well as "If the Devil Danced (In Empty Pockets)", "Third Rock from the Sun", "Pickup Man" and "Bigger Than the Beatles".

Studio albums

1990s

2000s and 2010s

Compilation albums

Singles

1990s

2000s and 2010s

Christmas singles

As a featured artist

Music videos

Notes

References

External links
 

Country music discographies
 
 
Discographies of American artists